Point Mosquitos ( or Mosquito) is a point on the Caribbean coast of Panama in Central America. It lies beside the Mosquitos Channel.

History
Point Mosquitos is sometimes connected with Comagre, the capital of the Indians under the cacique Carlos encountered by Vasco Núñez de Balboa and the origin of the English word savanna.

References

Headlands of Panama